Rafsanjan University of Medical Sciences (RUMS), is located in the city of Rafsanjan in Kerman Province, south central of Iran.

The university was established by the Iranian Ministry of Health in 1986. At the present, RUMS have five schools including School of Medicine, School of Dentistry, School of Nursing & Midwifery, School of Para-medicine and School of Health in which students are studying in various disciplines and grades including professional doctorate in Medicine, Professional doctorate in Dentistry,  Master of Biochemistry, Master of Physiology, Bachelor of nursing, Bachelor of laboratory Sciences, Bachelor of Midwifery, Bachelor of Radiology, Bachelor of Anesthesiology, Bachelor of Operating Room and Technician of Emergency Medicine.

Currently, the number of academic members at the University of Medical Sciences is 190. So far, 20 courses of medical students have graduated from Rafsanjan School of Medicine. At present, over 1400 students of various disciplines and levels are studying in the university.

The university manages or supervises four hospitals including Aliebn-e-Abitaleb, Niknafs, Moradi and Anar Vali-e-Asr, as well as all urban and rural health centers and clinics in the Rafsanjan and Anar counties.

External links
Official website
RUMS Vice Chancellery for Research and Technology
Rafsanjan School of Medicine

Medical schools in Iran
Universities in Iran
Education in Kerman Province
Buildings and structures in Kerman Province

1986 establishments in Iran
Educational institutions established in 1986